George T. Grossberg is the Samuel W. Fordyce professor and director of Geriatric Psychiatry in the Department of Psychiatry at Saint Louis University School of Medicine. He is a past president of the American Association for Geriatric Psychiatry and of the International Psychogeriatric Association. He is a member of the AMDA – The Society for Post-Acute and Long-Term Care Medicine. Dr. Grossberg is a consistent awardee of America's Best Doctors for his work as a board certified geriatric psychiatrist and exceptional research on Alzheimer's disease.

Grossberg was born in Hajdúböszörmény, Hungary and came to the United States as a refugee.

References

Year of birth missing (living people)
Living people
American psychiatrists
Hungarian emigrants to the United States